Griselda Antonia Álvarez Brigges (born 21 June 1982) is a Bolivian footballer who plays as a defender. She has been a member of the Bolivia women's national team.

Early life
Álvarez hails from the Cochabamba Department.

International career
Álvarez played for Bolivia at senior level in two Copa América Femenina editions (2010 and 2014).

References

1982 births
Living people
Women's association football defenders
Bolivian women's footballers
People from Cochabamba Department
Bolivia women's international footballers